Duncan MacDougall may refer to:

Duncan MacDougall, Donnchadh of Argyll (died 1240s), Scottish noble
Duncan MacDougall (doctor) (c. 1866–1920), American doctor